Bay City Municipal Airport  is a city-owned public-use airport located five nautical miles (9 km) east of the central business district of Bay City, in Matagorda County, Texas, United States.

Although most U.S. airports use the same three-letter location identifier for the FAA and IATA, this airport is assigned BYY by the FAA and BBC by the IATA.

Facilities and aircraft 
It has one runway designated 13/31 with a 5,107 by 75 ft (1,557 x 23 m) asphalt surface.

For the 12-month period ending March 27, 2008, the airport had 8,750 aircraft operations, an average of 23 per day: 99% general aviation and 1% military. At that time there were 33 aircraft based at this airport: 70% single-engine, 3% multi-engine, 6% helicopter and 21% ultralight.

References

External links 
 

Airports in Texas
Transportation in Matagorda County, Texas
Buildings and structures in Matagorda County, Texas